Velikodvorsky is a rural locality (a settlement) and the administrative center of Posyolok Velikodvorsky, Gus-Khrustalny District, Vladimir Oblast, Russia. The population was 1,984 as of 2010. There are 19 streets.

Geography 
Velikodvorsky is located 47 km south of Gus-Khrustalny (the district's administrative centre) by road. Velikodvorye is the nearest rural locality.

References 

Rural localities in Gus-Khrustalny District